Domenico Alaleona (16 November 1881 – 28 December 1928) was an Italian organist and composer. He was born in and died in Montegiorgio.

External links
Alaleona 

Italian composers
Italian male composers
Italian organists
Male organists
1881 births
1928 deaths
People from the Province of Fermo
19th-century Italian musicians
20th-century organists
20th-century Italian male musicians
19th-century Italian male musicians